Paicî is the most widely spoken of the two dozen languages on the main island of New Caledonia. It is spoken in a band across the center of the island, from Poindimié to Ponérihouen.

Phonology

Paicî has a rather simple inventory of consonants, compared to other languages of New Caledonia, but it has an unusually large number of nasal vowels. Paicî syllables are restricted to CV.

Consonants

The palatal stops could be considered affricates because they occur with a heavily fricated release. The lateral and tap do not occur word-initially, except in a few loanwords and the prefix  they.

Because nasal stops are always followed by nasal vowels, but prenasalized stops are always followed by oral vowels, it might be argued that nasal and prenasalized stops are allophonic, which would reduce the Paicî consonant inventory to 13.

Vowels
Paicî has a symmetrical system of ten oral vowels, all found both long and short without any significant difference in quality, and seven nasal vowels, some of which may also be long and short. Because sequences of two short vowels may carry two tones but long vowels are restricted to carrying one tone, they appear to be phonemically long vowels rather than sequences.

Tones
Like its neighbour Cèmuhî, Paicî is one of the few Austronesian languages which have developed contrastive tone, involving three registers: high, mid, low. Additionally, there are vowels with no inherent tone, whose tone is determined by their environment. Words commonly have the same tone on all vowels, so tone may belong to the word rather than the syllable.

Notes

References

 
 
 Rivierre, Jean-Claude. 1983. Dictionnaire paicî - français, suivi d'un lexique français - paicî. Paris : Société d'Etudes linguistiques et anthropologiques de France, 1983. 375p.

External links 

 Alphabet and pronunciation at Omniglot
 Information on Paicî, with a list of references and a recorded text (website of LACITO-CNRS)

New Caledonian languages
Languages of New Caledonia
Tonal languages in non-tonal families